Anders Järryd and John McEnroe were the defending champions, but Järryd chose not to compete this year.

McEnroe partnered up with Andrés Gómez, and they won in the final 6–1, 6–1 against Mansour Bahrami and Henri Leconte.

Draw

Final

Group A
Standings are determined by: 1. number of wins; 2. number of matches; 3. in three-players-ties, percentage of sets won, or of games won; 4. steering-committee decision.

Group B
Standings are determined by: 1. number of wins; 2. number of matches; 3. in three-players-ties, percentage of sets won, or of games won; 4. steering-committee decision.

References
Completed matches, accessed 04/06/10.

Legends Over 45 Doubles